Communist takeover refers to:

 Communist takeover of Laos
 Communist takeover of Mainland China
 Communist takeover of Saigon